The Taipei Metro Xiaobitan Branch Line is a high-capacity, elevated branch line of the Songshan–Xindian line. Although it is a high-capacity line, only 1 train set (3 cars) is currently being used. The station itself is built inside the Xindian Depot.

History 

 24 September 2004: Xiaobitan Line opens for free trials.
 29 September 2004: Xiaobitan Line begins revenue service.
 22 July 2006: A three-car train set built especially for the Xiaobitan Branch Line begins operations.
 6 October 2007: Due to strong winds from Hurricane Krosa, service was temporarily suspended from 3:30 PM.

When the line first opened, some people complained about noise problems. Thus, sound-muffling walls were built along the tracks coming into the station.

The line has a capacity of 4,140 passengers per hour.

Stations

Xindian Depot
The Xindian Line Depot is part of this station. A joint development project to construct an artificial ground area for commercial, residential, and office buildings is under construction. The completion of the project would reduce noise pollution from passing trains and would allow for recreation, entertainment, and work through mixed-use architecture.

References

Taipei Metro
Railway lines opened in 2004